The Journal of Contemporary Criminal Justice is a quarterly peer-reviewed academic journal that covers the field of criminology. The editor-in-chief is Chris Eskridge (University of Nebraska). It was established in 1978 and is currently published by SAGE Publications.

Abstracting and indexing 
The Journal of Contemporary Criminal Justice is abstracted and indexed in:
 Academic Search Complete
 Academic Search Premier
 Business Source Complete
 Business Source Premier
 Scopus
 ZETOC

External links 
 

SAGE Publishing academic journals
English-language journals
Criminology journals
Quarterly journals
Publications established in 1978